Sir Robert Cotton (2 May 1644 – 17 September 1717) was an English politician. He sat as a Member of Parliament from 1679 to 1701 and briefly in 1702.

Life
He was the third son of Sir Thomas Cotton, 2nd Baronet, the second by Sir Thomas's second wife Alice. He was granted the manor of Hatley, Cambridgeshire by his half-brother in 1662, the year of his father's death.

He sat as a Member of Parliament for Cambridgeshire from 1679 to 1695, for Newport, Isle of Wight from 1695 to 1701 and briefly for Truro in 1702. He was selected as High Sheriff of Cambridgeshire and Huntingdonshire for Jan–Nov 1688.

A Tory, he was one of the joint holders of the Postmaster General position from 1691 after the dismissal of John Wildman.

References

1644 births
1717 deaths
Members of the pre-1707 English Parliament for constituencies in Cornwall
English MPs 1680–1681
English MPs 1681
English MPs 1685–1687
English MPs 1689–1690
English MPs 1690–1695
English MPs 1695–1698
English MPs 1698–1700
English MPs 1701–1702
High Sheriffs of Cambridgeshire and Huntingdonshire
United Kingdom Postmasters General
Younger sons of baronets